The Sierra del Burro (also called Serranías del Burro) is the northernmost finger of the Sierra Madre Oriental in the state of Coahuila, Mexico.

Geography
The Sierra del Burro increases in altitude and width as it goes from north to south.

The Rio San Rodrigo is the largest river originating in the Sierra del Burro. The drainage from the Sierra is to the Rio Grande. The Sierra is located in the Chihuahua Desert, and most of the vegetation is arid or semi-arid desert scrub, including chaparral and Tamaulipan matorral. Among the fauna are the American black bear, an endangered species in Mexico, except for the Sierra del Burro where it is still found in fair numbers, but considered at risk. Beaver are also found in the Sierra. Due to its proximity the flora and fauna have similarities to that of the Big Bend region of Texas.

The climate is arid to semi-arid. Most precipitation occurs in the summer, but notably vigorous convection occurs in April and May. The Sierra del Burro and an area extending slightly southward for decades has been recognized by meteorologists using satellite and radar data as a region of consistent and intense supercell activity, orographically influenced by the Sierra, and annually producing significant tornadoes and hail.

Due to the rugged terrain, aridity, and inhospitable environment, there are no towns or any paved roads in the Sierra. The sparse population mostly inhabits large ranches.

Conservation
The Sierra del Burro is outside the boundaries of the binational El Carmen-Big Bend Conservation Corridor Initiative, but local ranchers, fearing fragmentation of their lands, have formed a group called CONECO to preserve their ranching heritage and promote wildlife and habitat preservation. The group now has about  protected.  National and international conservation groups see CONECO as a model for private land conservation in Mexico.

References

Landforms of Coahuila
Sierra Madre Oriental
Mountain ranges of Mexico